At the 2011 Pan Arab Games, the bowling events were held at Qatar Bowling Center in Doha, Qatar from 11 to 15 December. A total of 6 events were contested.

Medal summary

Men

Medal table

References

External links
Bowling at official website

Events at the 2011 Pan Arab Games
Pan Arab Games
2011 Pan Arab Games